Arlington is an unincorporated community and census-designated place (CDP) in Maricopa County, Arizona, United States, located  west of downtown Phoenix on old U.S 80. It follows the street numbering system of Phoenix. As of the 2020 census, the population was 150, down from 194 at the 2010 census.

Demographics 

Arlington first appeared on the 1910 U.S. Census as a precinct of Maricopa County. It appeared again in 1920 as the 53rd precinct of Maricopa County (AKA Arlington). In 1930, it simply appeared as the Arlington Precinct again. It was recorded as having a White majority for that census The population was 25 in the 1960 census. 

In 2010, it was made a census-designated place (CDP).

As of the census of 2010, there were 194 people living in the CDP. The population density was 82.8 people per square mile. The racial makeup of the CDP was 69.1% White, 0.5% Black or African American, 1.6% Native American, 24.2% from other races, and 4.6% from two or more races. 29.9% of the population were Hispanic or Latino of any race.

Hassayampa Bridge
The historic Hassayampa River Bridge, listed on the National Register of Historic Places, is located nearby.

References 

Census-designated places in Maricopa County, Arizona